Kuboes is a town in Richtersveld Local Municipality in the Northern Cape province of South Africa.

Kuboes was one of the first permanent settlements on the Richtersveld. The town grew around a Rhenish mission set up by revered Johan Hein, who began to preach to the nomadic population of the surrounding areas in 1844. A church was built in 1893, and eventually the itinerant population decided to set up in Kuboes itself.

Kuboes is a centre of Nama culture, and the local school is claimed to be the only school in the world that teaches the Nama language.

References

Populated places in the Richtersveld Local Municipality